The 2016 Tipperary Senior Hurling Championship was the 126th staging of the Tipperary Senior Hurling Championship since its establishment by the Tipperary County Board in 1887. The first round of the Championship began on 9 April.	
 
Thurles Sarsfields were the defending champions.

Thurles Sarsfields played Kiladangan in the final, a repeat of the 1938 decider, Kiladangan’s last appearance in the final.

The final was played in Semple Stadium on 16 October, with Thurles Sarsfields winning the game by 0-27 to 1-15 in front of 6,546 spectators. Tipperary and Thurles legend Mickey Byrne died at age 93 on the morning of the match. It was a third successive win for Thurles, and the first time they've won three-in-a-row since the 1960s.

Results

Group stage

Roinn 1 Group 1 table

Roinn 1 Group 1 results

Roinn 1 Group 2 table

Roinn 1 Group 2 results

Roinn 1 Group 3 table

Roinn 1 Group 3 results

Roinn 1 Group 4 table

Roinn 1 Group 4 results

Roinn 1 relegation group table

Roinn 1 relegation group results

Roinn 2 Group 1 table

Roinn 2 Group 1 results

Roinn 2 Group 2 table

Roinn 2 Group 1 results

Roinn 2 Group 3 table

Roinn 2 Group 3 results

Roinn 2 Group 4 table

Roinn 2 Group 4 results

Preliminary quarter-finals

Quarter-finals

Semi-finals

Final

Championship statistics

Top scorers

In a single game

In a single game

Miscellaneous

 Kiladangan qualify for the senior final for the first time.

References

Tipperary Senior Hurling Championship
Tipperary Senior Hurling Championship